Cienna is a red Australian wine grape variety first harvested in 2000. It is a mix between the Spanish wine grape Sumoll and Cabernet Sauvignon grape. This grape was initially created in 1972 by CSIRO. The aim was to produce high quality grapes suited for Australian conditions. One of the most notable wineries that produces a light-style, light-alcohol Cienna wine is Brown Brothers from Victoria, Australia.

See also
Tarrango, another Australian wine grape variety bred by CSIRO and notably commercialised by Brown Brothers
Mystique, another Australian wine grape variety bred by CSIRO and notably commercialised by Brown Brothers

References

External links
 CSIRO Cienna fact sheet

Red wine grape varieties